The Birmingham Hippodrome is a theatre situated on Hurst Street in the Chinese Quarter of Birmingham, England.

Although best known as the home stage of the Birmingham Royal Ballet, it also hosts a wide variety of other performances including visiting opera and ballet companies, touring West End shows, pantomime and drama.

With a regular annual attendance of over 600,000, the Hippodrome is the busiest single theatre in the United Kingdom, and the busiest venue for dance outside London.

History

The first venue built on the Hippodrome site was a building of assembly rooms in 1895. In 1899 the venue was redesigned by local architect F. W. Lloyd, a stage and circus ring was added together with a Moorish tower (removed 1963) and the enterprise named it the "Tower of Varieties". After failing, this was soon rebuilt as a normal variety theatre, reopened as the "Tivoli" in 1900, finally becoming "The Hippodrome" under the ownership of impresario Thomas Barrasford in October 1903. The current neo-classical auditorium seats 1,900 and was designed by Burdwood and Mitchell in 1924. Following the construction of the nearby Smallbrook Queensway, the entrance building and tower were demolished in 1963, and a new modern entrance constructed. At the same time, the theatre was renamed 'Birmingham Theatre' for a time.

In the 1970s it was sold to Birmingham City Council, and has since 1979 operated under the Birmingham Hippodrome Theatre Trust, a registered charity.

This plain facade was refaced in the 1980s with a mock-Victorian plasterwork, while the stagehouse was demolished and rebuilt to accommodate larger shows. The decade also saw the theatre host the Central Television revival of the ITV talent show New Faces, hosted by Marti Caine.

The exterior of the theatre was substantially rebuilt by Associated Architects and Law and Dunbar-Nasmith in 2001, with a new glass facade and accommodation for the Birmingham Royal Ballet and additional performance space.

Present day 
The Hippodrome has presented large scale West End touring musicals and plays, such as Wicked, Chitty Chitty Bang Bang, The Lion King, Matilda, Mary Poppins, Annie, Grease, Les Misérables, The Phantom of the Opera, War Horse, Billy Elliot, Mamma Mia! and We Will Rock You.

In July 2015, comedian and actor Brian Conley was celebrated at the end of a performance of Barnum, having performed at the Hippodrome for 600 performances, appearing in six pantomimes, Jolson, Chitty Chitty Bang Bang, Hairspray, Oliver! and hosting the 1999 Royal Variety Performance at the theatre.

On 8 October 2020 it was announced that Birmingham City Council had given the green light to a phased redevelopment of the theatre, to create a new facade together with a first floor terrace and creating an outdoor seating area with access to refreshment areas and a new restaurant on the third floor. Work is due to commence in early 2021.

Pantomime 
The theatre's Christmas pantomimes are produced by Crossroads Pantomimes previously Qdos Entertainment, over recent years attracting stars such as Brian Conley, Don Maclean, Julian Clary, Joe Pasquale, John Barrowman, Joan Collins, Nigel Havers, Keith Harris, Lynda Bellingham, Lesley Joseph, Gary Wilmot, Paul Zerdin, Gok Wan, John Partridge, Jane McDonald, Marti Pellow, Lee Mead, The Krankies, Steve McFadden, Jodie Prenger, Beverley Knight, Danny Mac, The Grumbleweeds, Jimmy Osmond, Darren Day, Meera Syal, Jaymi Hensley, Joe McElderry and Faye Brookes. Comedian Matt Slack has appeared since 2013, returning every year due to popular demand.

References

Sources
Pevsner Architectural Guides - Birmingham, Andy Foster, 2005,

External links

 
 

Hippodromem Birmingham
Theatres in Birmingham, West Midlands
Event venues established in 1895
LGBT culture in Birmingham, West Midlands